Raji Sourani (born 31 December 1953 in the Gaza Strip) is a human rights lawyer in the Gaza Strip. He is married and is the father of two children, and lives in the Gaza Strip.

He was an Amnesty International prisoner of conscience in 1985 and 1988, member of International Commission of Jurists EXCO and IDAL EXCO, and Vice President of the International Federation of Human Rights. He was a recipient of the Robert F Kennedy Human Rights Award in 1991, given each year to an individual whose courageous activism is at the heart of the human rights movement and in the spirit of Robert F. Kennedy's vision and legacy. In 1995, he founded the Palestinian Centre for Human Rights and is its director. 

Sourani was active in the cases of Palestinians representing deportation, and in monitoring the conditions of Israeli prisons and detentions. He remains an unreserved critic of human rights violations occurring on both sides of the conflict.

Sourani was selected for the 2003 Oak Institute for Human Rights Fellowship at Colby College in Waterville, Maine. However, his visa was not approved and he was unable to travel to the United States at that time. Sourani was also denied a  permit to exit Gaza to attend a human rights conference in September 2008.

Sourani was co-awarded the Right Livelihood Award on September 26, 2013 for "his unwavering dedication to the rule of law and human rights under exceptionally difficult circumstances."
Sourani served “a three-year sentence [1979-1982] imposed by an Israeli court which convicted him of membership in the illegal Popular Front for the Liberation of Palestine, a designated terrorist organization. He was also denied a US entry visa in 2012. Sourani was imprisoned an additional three times, in 1985 and 1986, and held in administrative detention in 1988.

References

External links
 Speak Truth To Power Defender Kerry Kennedy Interview
 Special Report A Matter of Principle: Gaza Human Rights Lawyer Raji Sourani
 Interview Raji Sourani - Vidéo Dailymotion FIDH Interview with Raji Sourani

Human rights in the Gaza Strip
20th-century Palestinian lawyers
People from the Gaza Strip
1954 births
Living people
Amnesty International prisoners of conscience held by Israel
Palestinian people imprisoned by Israel
Robert F. Kennedy Human Rights Award laureates
21st-century Palestinian lawyers

jp:ラージー・アッ＝スーラーニー